Ballinvoy is a townland in the Parish of Aughagower and Barony of Burrishoole. It is bordered by the following townlands: to the north by Meneen, to the northwest by Ardogommon, to the east by Knockrooskey, to the southeast by the Deerpark,  to the southwest by Mountbrown, and to the west by Coolloughra. All of these are also in the Parish of Aughagower.

References 

Townlands of County Mayo